John Caldwell "Jack" Wardrop (born 26 May 1932) is a male former competitive swimmer who represented Great Britain and Scotland.

Swimming career
While Wardrop was competing for Scotland, Wardrop won a silver and bronze medal at the 1954 British Empire and Commonwealth Games in Vancouver.  Wardrop also competed for Great Britain at the 1948 Summer Olympics, 1952 Summer Olympics, and 1956 Summer Olympics.
  
Wardrop attended the University of Michigan, where he swam for the Michigan Wolverines swimming and diving team in National Collegiate Athletic Association (NCAA) and Big Ten Conference competition from 1953 to 1955.  He won NCAA national championships in the 220-yard freestyle in 1954 and 1955. He won the 1952 ASA National Championship 110 yards freestyle title, and the 1950, 1952 and 1954 ASA National Championship 220 yards freestyle titles  and the 1950, 1951 and 1952 ASA National Championship 440 yards freestyle titles.

Personal life
He is the twin brother of Bert Wardrop and the pair learned to swim at Motherwell Baths. They were members of the Motherwell Amateur Swimming & Water Polo Club.

See also
 List of Commonwealth Games medallists in swimming (men)
 List of University of Michigan alumni
 World record progression 200 metres freestyle

References

External links
 Jack Wardrop biography and Olympic results, from https://web.archive.org/web/20100201172906/http://www.sports-reference.com/ retrieved 2010-01-27.

1932 births
Living people
Twin sportspeople
Scottish twins
Commonwealth Games silver medallists for Scotland
Commonwealth Games bronze medallists for Scotland
World record setters in swimming
Michigan Wolverines men's swimmers
Olympic swimmers of Great Britain
Scottish male swimmers
Swimmers at the 1948 Summer Olympics
Swimmers at the 1952 Summer Olympics
Swimmers at the 1954 British Empire and Commonwealth Games
Swimmers at the 1956 Summer Olympics
Commonwealth Games medallists in swimming
Medallists at the 1954 British Empire and Commonwealth Games